HMS Vigilant was a V-class destroyer of the British Royal Navy that saw service during World War II.

Second World War service
She and Virago sank . 
Also part of the escorting destroyers of the 21st Aircraft Carrier Squadron involved in Operation Dracula from April to May 1945.
She participated in the Battle of the Malacca Strait with the destroyers  Saumarez, and Virago which culminated in the sinking of the Japanese cruiser  on 16 May 1945.

Post-War service
In January 1946 Vigilant was part of the Londonderry Flotilla and in September 1946 went to the Mediterranean.  Between 1947 and 1951 she was held in reserve at Portsmouth.

In 1951 she began conversion into a Type 15 fast anti-submarine frigate, by Thornycroft at Woolston.  She was also allocated the new pennant number F93. Between 1953 and 1955 she was part of the 6th Frigate Squadron as part of the Home Fleet. In October 1954 she collided with another Type 15 Frigate HMS Relentless and was repaired at Devonport Dockyard.

In 1955 she had been converted for use as a training frigate and became leader of the Dartmouth Training Squadron. In 1956 this consisted of Vigilant, Venus,  and the minesweepers Jewel and Acute.

Decommissioning and disposal
Vigilant was paid off in 1963 and arrived at Faslane for breaking up on 4 June 1965.

Notes

Publications

External links
 Naval-History.net HMS Vigilant
 

 

U and V-class destroyers of the Royal Navy
Ships built by Swan Hunter
Ships built on the River Tyne
1942 ships
World War II destroyers of the United Kingdom
Cold War destroyers of the United Kingdom
Type 15 frigates
Cold War frigates of the United Kingdom